Louriniidae is a family of crustaceans belonging to the order Harpacticoida.

Genera:
 Archeolourinia Corgosinho & Schizas, 2013
 Ceyloniella
 Lourinia Wilson, 1924

References

Harpacticoida